The Roman Catholic Diocese of Tingzhou/Changting is a diocese co-extensive with the Chinese imperial prefecture Tingzhou fu. The cathedral is located in the present-day Tingzhou town.

Post-revolutionary facts on the ground notwithstanding, the diocese remains in the Ecclesiastical province of Fuzhou, under the Metropolitan See at Fuzhou.

History
 December 27, 1923: Established as Apostolic Prefecture of Tingzhou 汀州 from the Apostolic Vicariate of Northern Fo-kien 福建北境
 May 8, 1947: Promoted as Diocese of Tingzhou 汀州

Bishops of Tingzhou 汀州 (Roman rite)
 Bishop Johann Werner Lesinski, O.P. (May 8, 1947 – April 26, 1963)

Prefects Apostolic of Tingzhou 汀州 (Roman Rite)
 Fr. Edber M. Pelzer, O.P. (December 21, 1925 – 1945)

References

 GCatholic.org
 Catholic Hierarchy

1923 establishments in China
Christianity in Fujian
Fuzhou
Christian organizations established in 1923
Roman Catholic dioceses and prelatures established in the 20th century
Roman Catholic dioceses in China